Isai Paadum Thendral is a 1986 Indian Tamil-language film directed by S. Devaraj. The film stars Sivakumar and Ambika. It is a remake of Malayalam film Ente Mohangal Poovaninju.

Plot 
Mohan's father wants him to marry Menaka but Mohan likes Kalyani. His father gives in to his demands but Menaka has other plans. On the marriage day, Menaka plots and murders Kalyani by poisoning in her milk which leaves Mohan depressed. After being coerced by his father, Mohan finally agrees to get married to Menaka. During the first night, Mohan kills himself by mixing poison on the milk and reveals to Menaka that he knows that she killed Kalyani and he desperately killed himself so that she will lead the rest of her life in a sad state. The film ends with Mohan breathing his last with the memories of Kalyani.

Cast 
Sivakumar
Ambika
K. P. Ummer
Janagaraj
Jayarekha
Goundamani
Nizhalgal Ravi
J. V. Ramana Murthy

Soundtrack
The doundtrack was composed by Ilaiyaraaja.

Endhan Kaikuttaiyai - K. J. Yesudas, S. Janaki
Isai Paadu Nee - S. Janaki
Raghuvara Ninnu - Balamurali Krishna, K. J. Yesudas, S. Janaki
Disco King - K. J. Yesudas, Vani Jairam
Vaazhaimaram Katti - K. J. Yesudas, S. Janaki
Manasuloni - K. J. Yesudas, S. Janaki

References

External links 
 
 

1980s Tamil-language films
1986 films
Films scored by Ilaiyaraaja
Tamil remakes of Malayalam films